The 2010 ACB Playoffs were the final phase of the 2009–10 ACB season. It started on Thursday, 20 May 2010 and ended on 15 June 2010. Caja Laboral won the final series 3–0 against Regal FC Barcelona.

Bracket

Quarterfinals
The quarterfinals were best-of-3 series.

Regal FC Barcelona vs. Gran Canaria 2014

Power Electronics Valencia vs. Unicaja

Caja Laboral vs. Asefa Estudiantes

Real Madrid vs. Cajasol

Semifinals
The Semifinals were best-of-5 series

Regal FC Barcelona vs. Unicaja

Caja Laboral vs. Real Madrid

ACB finals
The finals was a best-of-5 series.

Regal FC Barcelona vs. Caja Laboral

ACB Finals MVP:  Tiago Splitter

References
 ACB.com
 GOALWIRE.com

Liga ACB playoffs
Playoffs